Ryerson Holding Corporation is a metals distributor and processor headquartered in Chicago, Illinois, United States.

Current operations
In addition to the United States, Ryerson has operations in Canada, China, and Mexico. Foreign operations accounted for less than 12% of total revenue in 2015.

History
The company was founded in 1842. In the early 1900s, when Ford Motor Company started producing vehicles, Ryerson supplied it with steel. In 1935, the company merged with Inland Steel Company. In 1946, the company owned a plant in Los Angeles, California, its first plant on the West Coast. In 2005, the company acquired Integris Metals. In 2007, the company was acquired by Platinum Equity. In 2014, the company went public via an initial public offering.

The old Ryerson Steel mill at 18th Street and Rockwell Avenue in Chicago was purchased by the Lagunitas Brewing Company in 2012.

References

External links

Companies based in Chicago
Companies listed on the New York Stock Exchange
2014 initial public offerings